Calibro 35 (caliber 35) is a cinematic funk Italian band formed in 2007 in Milan.
The band has released seven albums and several movie soundtracks.
Different songs from the band have been sampled into hip hop productions including Dr. Dre's "One Shot One Kill" and Jay Z's "Picasso Baby".

Biography 
The band started in 2007 when Italian producer Tommaso Colliva and guitarist Massimo Martellotta invited Enrico Gabrielli, Luca Cavina and Fabio Rondanini to what was supposed to be a five days long one-off studio project re-recording obscure music from Italian exploitation movie soundtracks.

The first self-titled Calibro 35 album was released worldwide by Cinedelic Records in 2008. The album mostly contains re-works of 1970s soundtracks by the genre's maestros such as Ennio Morricone, Armando Trovajoli and Luis Bacalov but also first original compositions by the band.  The unexpected critical acclaim the album received led the band to perform the project live too, touring Italy and Europe.

Live concerts proved to be even more successful than the album with the band winning "Best Italian Tour" award at PIMI/MEI 2009.
The same year the group embarked on its first tour in the United States. Calibro 35 played at HitWeek Festival in Los Angeles and at Nublu and Zebulon in New York City. They also performed on Jason Bentley's radio show Morning Becomes Eclectic on KCRW: one of the most important broadcasts of live music in the United States. In September they co-headlined closing event of Milan Film Festival with Australian band Jet.

In February 2010 second album Ritornano quelli di... was released by Ghost Records in Europe and by Nublu Records in the United States. The album contains several original songs written and recorded as soundtrack for American documentary Eurocrime. One of the songs from the album, "Convergere in Giambellino", has been used as ending titles music of Hollywood blockbuster movie Red (Movie 2010) starring Bruce Willis and John Malkovich.

During the same year Calibro 35 recorded its first full length soundtrack for Italian-Spanish production SAID at Ennio Morricone's studios in Rome.

On June 8, 2010 they opened English rock band Muse concert at San Siro Stadium in Milan. In September, they won "Best Band 2010" at Keep On Music Awards. In October, Calibro 35 played CMJ Festival in New York.

Back in the US to play SXSW Festival in Austin in Spring 2011, the band decided to stop at Mission Sound and Brooklyn Recordings Studios in New York to record the third album. The album, titled Any Resemblance to Real Persons or Actual Facts Is Purely Coincidental, was released in February 2012 by Nublu Records in the US and by Tannen Records/Rough Trade Distribution in Europe. The title track of the album would be sampled by Dr. Dre for his Compton in 2015. In summer 2012 Calibro 35 opened for Sharon Jones & The Dap-Kings in Bari.

In March 2013, the band travelled to Brazil for Nublu Jazz Festival, sharing stage with The Headhunters, Roy Ayers and Robert Glasper's Experiment.
On June 29 Calibro 35 opened again for Muse at Olympic Stadium in Turin.
In October a new album, Traditori di tutti, was released worldwide by Record Kicks. For the first time the album contains only original music. After the album release the band embarked in another extensive tour playing in all major European cities.

In 2014, Italian public national broadcaster Rai Radio 1 commissioned all its jingles and library music to the band. Meanwhile, the band scored its second full length soundtrack for Italian Movie "Sogni di Gloria / Daydreaming", awarded as "Best Feature Movie" at Houston Film Fest and Rome Independent Film Fest.

They further released the albums S.P.A.C.E. in 2015, Decade in 2018, and Momentum in 2020.

Sampling 
Several songs of the band have been sampled into modern style productions. Most notably "Ogni riferimento a fatti realmente accaduti" has been sampled by Dr. Dre on "One Shot One Kill (feat Snoop Dogg and Jon Connor)"; "Il consigliori" has been sampled by Jay Z on "Picasso Baby", "Una stanza vuota" has been sampled by Child of Lov on "One Day (featuring Damon Albarn)"; "Eurocrime" has been sampled by Demigodz on "Summer of Sam".

Personnel 
Enrico Gabrielli - keyboards, flute, saxophone, xylophone
Luca Cavina - bass
Massimo Martellotta - guitar, keyboards
Fabio Rondanini - drums
Tommaso Colliva - Sound Researches and Production

Discography 
 2008 - Calibro 35 (Cinedelic Records CNCD14)
 2010 - Ritornano quelli di... (Ghost Records GHST 035)
 2012 - Ogni riferimento a persone esistenti o a fatti realmente accaduti è puramente casuale - (Tannen Records FIR.Y15)
 2013 - Traditori di tutti - (Record Kicks RKX046)
 2015 - S.P.A.C.E.
 2018 - DECADE
 2020 - Momentum
 2022 - Scacco al Maestro - Volume 1
 2022 - Scacco al Maestro - Volume 2

See also 
Poliziottesco
Funk music
Jazz fusion
Spaghetti Western
Zeus! (band)

References

Italian rock music groups
Musical groups from Milan